The People's Labour Party was a short-lived political party in Cuba. It appeared in public with its programme in August 1901. The party was a continuation of the People's Party of Diego Vicente Tejera. However, it appears that Diego Vicente Tejera had no links to the People's Labour Party.

Overview
The statues and programmes of the party were edited by a commission consisting of Cristóbal de la Guardia, Joaquín Alba and Manuel Cendoya. It raised demands such as 8-hour working day, racial equality and the right to form trade unions.  However the party failed to make any significant political breakthrough.

The party decided to support the presidential candidature of Bartolomé Masó in the 1901 elections.

References

Defunct political parties in Cuba
Socialist parties in Cuba
Political parties established in 1901
1901 establishments in Cuba